The Nauruan navigational system is a way of expressing direction, similar to North, South, East and West, but limitations in the system mean that it is unable to be used outside of Nauru.

The four main directions are pago, poe, pawa and pwiju (pwijiuw). Other directions include Gankoro and Arijeijen.

References

Geography of Nauru
Orientation (geometry)